The World Revolves Around You (German: Jetzt dreht die Welt sich nur um dich) is a 1964 Austrian musical film directed by Wolfgang Liebeneiner and starring Gitte Hænning, Rex Gildo and Claus Biederstaedt.

It was shot at the Rosenhügel Studios in Vienna and on location in Heidelberg. The film's sets were designed by the art director Leo Metzenbauer. It was produced with the backing of the major German distributor Constantin Film.

Synopsis
Lilian, the daughter of a Danish newspaper magnate and aspiring singer, returns home from boarding school in Switzerland. Frustrated by her father's refusal to pursue her musical career, she flees in her aunt's car to Germany, ending up in Heidelberg where she meets Martin, a student.

Cast
Gitte Hænning as Lilian Andreesen
 Rex Gildo as Martin Fischer, Student
 Claus Biederstaedt as Peter Winters, reporter
 Ruth Stephan as Henriette Andreesen, Lilians Tante
 Mara Lane as Baby Bird
 Gunther Philipp as Stefan Vogt
 Evi Kent as Trude Schnäbele, Sekretärin
 Klaus Dahlen as Fritz Unverzagt, Martins Freund
 Gustav Knuth as Holger Andreesen, Lilians Vater
 Hans Söhnker as Richard Fischer, Martins Vater
 Wolfgang Liebeneiner as Universitäts-Professor 
 Raoul Retzer as Schädler

References

Bibliography 
 Von Dassanowsky, Robert. Austrian Cinema: A History. McFarland, 2005.

External links 
 

1964 films
Austrian musical films
1964 musical films
1960s German-language films
Films directed by Wolfgang Liebeneiner
Constantin Film films
Films shot at Rosenhügel Studios
Films set in Heidelberg
Films set in Denmark